The 30th Air Division (30th AD) is an inactive United States Air Force organization.  Its last assignment was with Air Defense Command, assigned to Tenth Air Force, being stationed at Sioux City Municipal Airport, Iowa.  It was inactivated on 18 September 1968.

History
Assigned to Air Defense Command (ADC) for most of its existence, the division's initial mission was the air defense of the upper Great Lakes region of the United States.  The 30th equipped, administered, trained, and provided operationally ready forces to the appropriate commanders for air defense. The division trained attached and assigned units and supervised and participated in numerous exercises such as Kiowa Knife and Mandan Indian.

Moved to Sioux City Municipal Airport in 1966 as part of an ADC reorganization and became responsible for air defense in a large area of the upper Midwest after the inactivation of the Sioux City Air Defense Sector.  Assumed additional designation of 30th NORAD Region after activation of the NORAD Combat Operations Center at the Cheyenne Mountain Complex, Colorado, and reporting was transferred to NORAD from ADC at Ent Air Force Base in April 1966.

The 30th administered and trained subordinate units, and participated in numerous air defense training exercises. In addition, during the 1960s it supervised training of Air National Guard units with a pertinent mobilization assignment.

Inactivated in September 1968 as ADC phased down its interceptor mission as the chances of a Soviet bomber attack on the United States seemed remote, its mission being consolidated into North American Aerospace Defense Command (NORAD) and its assets transferred to 24th NORAD Region/Air Division.

Lineage
 Established as the 30 Air Division (Defense) on 8 November 1949
 Activated on 16 December 1949
 Inactivated on 1 February 1952
 Organized on 1 February 1952
 Redesignated 30 Air Division (SAGE) on 1 April 1959
 Discontinued and inactivated on 18 September 1968

Assignments
 Tenth Air Force, 16 December 1949 (attached to Eastern Air Defense Force after 1 January 1951)
 Eastern Air Defense Force, 1 September 1950 – 1 July 1959
 Air Defense Command, 1 July 1959
 Tenth Air Force, 1 April 1966 – 18 September 1968

Stations
 Selfridge Air Force Base, Michigan – 16 December 1949 – 7 April 1952
 Willow Run Airport (later Willow Run Air Force Station), Michigan, 7 April 1952
 Truax Field, Wisconsin, 1 April 1959
 Sioux City Municipal Airport, Iowa, 1 April 1966 – 18 September 1968

Components

Division
 31st Air Division (attached): 27 November 1950 – 1 February 1951

Sectors

 Chicago Air Defense Sector: 1 April 1959 – 1 April 1966
 Truax Field, Wisconsin
 Detroit Air Defense Sector: 8 January 1957 – 4 September 1963
 Custer Air Force Station, Michigan

 Duluth Air Defense Sector: 1 April 1959 – 1 April 1966
 Duluth Airport, Minnesota
 Sault Ste Marie Air Defense Sector: 1 April 1959 – 15 December 1963
 K.I. Sawyer Air Force Base, Michigan

Wings

 1st Fighter Wing (Air Defense), 18 October 1956 – 1 April 1959
 Selfridge Air Force Base, Michigan
 56th Fighter Interceptor Wing: attached 20 February 1950 – 6 February 1952
 Selfridge Air Force Base, Michigan
 328th Fighter Wing: 1 April 1966 – 18 July 1968
 Richards-Gebaur Air Force Base, Missouri
 343d Fighter Wing: 1 April-1 July 1959
 Duluth Municipal Airport, Minnesota
 412th Fighter Wing: 8 July 1956 – 1 April 1960
 Wurtsmith Air Force Base, Michigan
 473d Fighter Wing: 1 April-1 October 1959
 K. I. Sawyer Air Force Base, Michigan

 507th Fighter Wing: 1 April 1959 – 1 April 1960
 Kincheloe Air Force Base, Michigan
 4706th Defense Wing (later 4706 Air Defense) Wing: 16 February 1953 – 1 March 1956
 Kincheloe Air Force Base, Michigan
 4708th Defense Wing (later 4708 Air Defense) Wing): 6 February 1952 – 18 October 1956
 Selfridge Air Force Base, Michigan
 4711th Air Defense Wing: 1 March – 8 July 1956
 Kincheloe Air Force Base, Michigan

Groups

 1st Fighter Group
 Selfridge Air Force Base, Michigan, 8 July-8 October 1956
 15th Fighter Group: 8 July 1956 – 1 September 1958
 Niagara Falls Municipal Airport, New York
 54th Fighter Group: 8 July 1956 – 8 January 1958
 Greater Pittsburgh Airport, Pennsylvania
 56th Fighter Group: 1 April 1959 – 1 April 1960
 K. I. Sawyer Air Force Base, Michigan
 79th Fighter Group: 8 July 1956 – 1 April 1959
 Youngstown Municipal Airport, Ohio
 327th Fighter Group: 1 April-1 June 1959
 Truax Field, Wisconsin

 343d Fighter Group
 Duluth International Airport, Minnesota, 1 April-15 November 1959
 412th Fighter Group
 Wurtsmith Air Force Base, Michigan, 8 July 1956 – 1 April 1960
 473d Fighter Group
 K. I. Sawyer Air Force Base, Michigan, 1 April-1 October 1959
 507th Fighter Group
 Kincheloe Air Force Base, Michigan, 1 April 1959 – 1 February 1961
 541st Aircraft Control and Warning Group
 Selfridge Air Force Base, Michigan, 1 January 1951 – 6 February 1952

Interceptor Squadrons

 18th Fighter-Interceptor Squadron: 1 April-1 May 1960
 Wurtsmith Air Force Base, Michigan
 56th Fighter-Interceptor Squadron: 1 September 1958 – 1 April 1959
 Wright-Patterson Air Force Base, Ohio
 71st Fighter-Interceptor Squadron: 25 October 1950 – 4 June 1951
 Greater Pittsburgh Airport, Pennsylvania

 87th Fighter-Interceptor Squadron: 1 September 1958 – 1 April 1959
 Lockbourne Air Force Base, Ohio
 319th Fighter-Interceptor Squadron: 1 September 1958 – 1 April 1959
 Bunker Hill Air Force Base, Indiana

Missile Squadron
 37th Air Defense Missile Squadron (BOMARC): 1 March – 1 April 1960
 Kincheloe Air Force Base, Michigan

Radar Squadrons

 625th Radar Squadron
 Hastings Air Force Station, Nebraska, 1 April 1966 – 8 September 1968
 639th Aircraft Control and Warning Squadron
 Lowther Air Station, Ontario, 1 April 1959 – 1 April 1960
 661st Aircraft Control and Warning Squadron
 Selfridge Air Force Base, Michigan, 8 July 1956 – 1 April 1959
 662d Aircraft Control and Warning Squadron
 Brookfield Air Force Station, Ohio, 8 July 1956 – 1 April 1959
 663d Aircraft Control and Warning Squadron
 Lake City Air Force Station, Tennessee, 6 February-5 August 1952
 664th Aircraft Control and Warning Squadron
 Bellefontaine Air Force Station, Ohio, 1 September 1958 – 1 April 1959
 665th Aircraft Control and Warning Squadron
 Calumet Air Force Station, Michigan, 1 April 1959 – 1 April 1960
 674th Aircraft Control and Warning Squadron
 Osceola Air Force Station, Wisconsin, 1 April-1 July 1959
 676th Aircraft Control and Warning Squadron
 Antigo Air Force Station, Wisconsin, 1 April 1959 – 1 April 1960
 677th Aircraft Control and Warning Squadron
 Alpena Air Force Station, Michigan, 8 July 1956 – 30 November 1957
 692d Aircraft Control and Warning Squadron
 Baudette Air Force Station, Minnesota, 1 April-1 July 1959
 695th Radar Squadron
 Pickstown Air Force Station, South Dakota, 1 April 1966 – 8 September 1968
 707th Aircraft Control and Warning Squadron
 Grand Rapids Air Force Station, Minnesota, 1 April-1 July 1959
 731st Radar Squadron
 Sundance Air Force Station, Wyoming, 1 April 1966 – 18 June 1968
 738th Radar Squadron
 Olathe Air Force Station, Kansas, 1 April 1966 – 8 September 1988
 752d Aircraft Control and Warning Squadron
 Empire Air Force Station, Michigan, 1 April 1959 – 1 April 1960
 753d Aircraft Control and Warning Squadron
 Sault Sainte Marie Air Force Station, Michigan, 1 April 1959 – 1 April 1960
 754th Aircraft Control and Warning Squadron
 Port Austin Air Force Station, Michigan, 6 February 1952 – 16 February 1953
 755th Radar Squadron
 Arlington Heights Air Force Station, Illinois, 1 December 1967 – 1 July 1968
 756th Aircraft Control and Warning Squadron
 Finland Air Force Station, Minnesota, 1 April-1 July 1959

 763d Aircraft Control and Warning Squadron
 Lockport Air Force Station, New York, 8 July 1956 – 1 September 1958
 781st Aircraft Control and Warning Squadron
 Custer Air Force Station, Michigan, 6 February 1952 – 16 February 1953
 782d Aircraft Control and Warning Squadron
 Rockville Air Force Station, Indiana, 6 February 1952 – 16 February 1953
 784th Aircraft Control and Warning Squadron
 Snow Mountain Air Force Station, Kentucky, 6 February 1952 – 16 February 1953
 787th Radar Squadron
 Chandler Air Force Station, Minnesota, 1 April 1966 – 1 July 1968
 788th Radar Squadron
 Waverly Air Force Station, Iowa, 1 December 1967 – 1 July 1968
 789th Radar Squadron
 Omaha Air Force Station, Nebraska, 1 April 1966 – 8 September 1968
 790th Radar Squadron
 Kirksville Air Force Station, Missouri, 1 December 1957 – 8 September 1968
 791st Radar Squadron
 Hanna City Air Force Station, Illinois, 1 December 1967 – 18 June 1968
 793d Radar Squadron
 Hutchinson Air Force Station, Kansas, 1 April 1966 – 8 September 1968
 798th Radar Squadron
 Belleville Air Force Station, Illinois, 1 December 1967 – 18 June 1968
 809th Aircraft Control and Warning Squadron
 Willow Run Airport, Michigan, 26–30 May 1953
 903d Radar Squadron
 Gettysburg Air Force Station, South Dakota, 1 April 1966 – 18 June 1968
 906th Aircraft Control and Warning Squadron
 Willow Run Airport, Michigan, 26–30 May 1953
 912th Aircraft Control and Warning Squadron
 Ramore Air Station, Ontario, 21 December 1952 – 16 February 1953; 8 July 1956 – 1 April 1960
 913th Aircraft Control and Warning Squadron
 Pagwa Air Station, Ontario, 21 December 1952 – 16 February 1953; 1 April 1959 – 1 April 1960
 914th Aircraft Control and Warning Squadron
 Armstrong Air Station, Ontario, 21 December 1952 – 16 February 1953; 1 April-15 November 1969
 915th Aircraft Control and Warning Squadron
 Sioux Lookout Air Station, Ontario, 1 April 1959 – 15 November 1969

See also
 List of United States Air Force Aerospace Defense Command Interceptor Squadrons
 List of United States Air Force air divisions
 United States general surveillance radar stations

References

Notes

Bibliography

 
 
 "ADCOM's Fighter Interceptor Squadrons". The Interceptor (January 1979) Aerospace Defense Command, (Volume 21, Number 1)

030
1949 establishments in Michigan
1968 disestablishments in Iowa